Joel Edward Tohline (born July 15, 1953) is an American astrophysicist, specializing in computer simulation of complex fluid flows in astrophysical systems.

Education and career
Tohline went to high school in New Orleans. He graduated in 1974 with a B.S. in physics from Centenary College of Louisiana and in 1978 with a Ph.D. in astronomy from the University of California, Santa Cruz. His thesis is entitled Fragmentation of Rotating Protostellar Clouds. As a postdoc he was from 1978 to 1980 a Willard Gibbs Instructor in Yale University's astronomy department and from 1980 to 1982 a postdoctoral fellow at Los Alamos National Laboratory. In Louisiana State University's department of physics and astronomy, he was from 1982 to 1986 an assistant professor, from 1986 to 1990 an associate professor, and from 1990 to 2002 a full professor and is since 2002 to the present Alumni Professor. From 1994 to 1997 he was chair of the department. He was from January to May 2000 a visiting associate in astronomy at California Institute of Technology. From 2010 to the present he is the director of the LSU Center for Computation & Technology.

Tohline is the author or coauthor of about 100 research articles. In 2007 he was elected a Fellow of the American Association for the Advancement of Science.

Selected publications
 
 
 
 Christodoulou, D. M., Shlosman, I., & Tohline, J. E. (1994). A New Criterion for Bar-Forming Instability in Rapidly Rotating Gaseous and Stellar Systems. I. Axisymmetric Form. arXiv preprint astro-ph/9411031.https://arxiv.org/abs/astro-ph/9411031

References

External links
 

1953 births
Living people
American astrophysicists
Centenary College of Louisiana
University of California, Santa Cruz alumni
Louisiana State University faculty
Fellows of the American Association for the Advancement of Science